Zarautz Rugby Taldea (known as Gesalaga Okelan Zarautz RT for sponsorship reasons) is a Spanish rugby team based in Zarautz.

History
The club was founded in 1977.

Season by season

2 seasons in División de Honor B

External links
Official website

Rugby union teams in the Basque Country (autonomous community)
Rugby clubs established in 1977
1977 establishments in Spain
Sport in Gipuzkoa